Logan McGuinness (born Logan Cotton, September 4, 1987) is a Canadian professional boxer in the Super Featherweight class. He is a local favorite amongst the community in Ontario. He fights out of Orangeville.

Early career
Logan started boxing at 14 in order to stop being bullied at school. One day he followed his older brother, Chandler, to the Big Tyme Gym in Orangeville and he immediately fell in love with it.

Professional career

Super Featherweight
June 24, 2011 McGuinness earned a hard-fought win by 10-round decision over another tough fighter, former Mexican Pacific Coast title-holder Daniel Ruiz to win the NABA Lightweight title.

On October 22, 2011 at the Hershey Centre, McGuinness stopped Gaudet by TKO at 1 :56 of the eleventh round for the NABA super featherweight title.

On September 24, 2013 at Casino Rama, McGuinness won a 12-round unanimous decision over Sergio Carlos Santillan to win the vacant NABA Featherweight title, and become the first ever 3 division NABA Champion.

| style="text-align:center;" colspan="8"|19 Wins (9 knockouts, 8 decisions),  0 Losses, 1 Draw(s)
|-  style="text-align:center; background:#e3e3e3;"
|  style="border-style:none none solid solid; "|Res.
|  style="border-style:none none solid solid; "|Record
|  style="border-style:none none solid solid; "|Opponent
|  style="border-style:none none solid solid; "|Type
|  style="border-style:none none solid solid; "|Rd., Time
|  style="border-style:none none solid solid; "|Date
|  style="border-style:none none solid solid; "|Location
|  style="border-style:none none solid solid; "|Notes
|- align=center
|Win
|align=center|20–0–1 ||align=left| Sergio Carlos Santillan
|
|
|
|align=left|
|align=left|
|- align=center
|Win
|align=center|19–0–1 ||align=left| Carlos Manuel Reyes
|
|
|
|align=left|
|align=left|
|- align=center
|Win
|align=center|18–0–1 ||align=left|
|
|align=left|
|align=left|
|- align=center
|Win
|align=center|17–0–1 ||align=left| Meacher Major
|
|
|
|align=left|
|align=left|
|- align=center
|Win
|align=center|16–0–1 ||align=left| Benoit Gaudet
|
|
|
|align=left|
|align=left|
|- align=center
|Win
|15-0-1
|align=left| Daniel Ruiz
|
|
|
|align=left|
|
|- align=center
|Win
|14-0-1
|align=left| Hector Julio Avila
|
|
|
|align=left|
|
|- align=center
|Win
|13-0-1
|align=left|
|
|align=left|
|
|- align=center
|Win
|11-0-1
|align=left| Jorge Banos
|
|
|
|align=left|
|
|- align=center
|Draw
|10-0-1
|align=left| Walter Estrada
|
|
|
|align=left|
|
|- align=center
|Win
|10-0
|align=left| Pedro Navarrete
|
|
|
|align=left|
|
|- align=center
|Win
|9-0
|align=left| Cesar Soriano
|
|
|
|align=left|
|
|- align=center
|Win
|8-0
|align=left| Hugo Pacheco
|
|
|
|align=left|
|
|- align=center
|Win
|7-0
|align=left| Jorge banos
|
|
|
|align=left|
|
|- align=center
|Win
|6-0
|align=left| Cesar Figueroa
|
|
|
|align=left|
|
|- align=center
|Win
|5-0
|align=left| Jean Charlamagne
|
|
|
|align=left|
|
|- align=center
|Win
|4-0
|align=left| Marcin Kulba
|
|
|
|align=left|
|
|- align=center
|Win
|3-0
|align=left| Sid Razak
|
|
|
|align=left|
|
|- align=center
|Win
|2-0
|align=left| Tim Watts
|
|
|
|align=left|
|
|- align=center
|Win
|1-0
|align=left| Juris Ivanovs
|
|
|
|align=left|
|

Titles in boxing

Major Sanctioning Bodies:

Minor Sanctioning Bodies:
NABA Featherweight Champion (126 lbs)
NABA Super Featherweight Champion (130 lbs)
NABA Lightweight Champion (135 lbs)

Notes

External links
 
 Hennessy Sports Bio

Canadian people of Irish descent
Super-featherweight boxers
1987 births
Living people
People from Orangeville, Ontario
Canadian male boxers